Lucrezia Borgia (Spanish:Lucrecia Borgia) is a 1947 Argentine historical film directed by Luis Bayón Herrera and starring Olinda Bozán, Héctor Quintanilla and Gogó Andreu. The film portrays the life of Lucrezia Borgia (1480-1519).

The film's sets were designed by the art director Juan Manuel Concado.

Cast
 Olinda Bozán
 Gogó Andreu
 Héctor Quintanilla
 Marcos Zucker
 Gloria Bernal 
 Marcos Caplán 
 René Cossa 
 Dringue Farías 
 Zelmar Gueñol 
 Semillita 
 Carlos Tajes

References

Bibliography 
 Gillespie, Gerald & Engel, Manfred & Dieterle, Bernard. Romantic Prose Fiction. John Benjamins Publishing, 2008.

External links 
 

1947 films
Argentine historical drama films
Argentine black-and-white films
1940s historical drama films
1940s Spanish-language films
Films directed by Luis Bayón Herrera
Films set in Italy
Films set in the 16th century
Cultural depictions of Lucrezia Borgia
Films scored by Alejandro Gutiérrez del Barrio
1947 drama films
1940s Argentine films